Super Junior (Syupeo Junieo) is a South Korean boy band. Formed in 2005 by producer Lee Soo-man of S.M. Entertainment, the group comprised a total of thirteen members at its peak. Super Junior originally debuted with twelve members, consisting of leader Leeteuk, Heechul, Hangeng, Yesung, Kangin, Shindong, Sungmin, Eunhyuk, Siwon, Donghae, Ryeowook and Kibum. Kyuhyun joined the group in 2006.

Super Junior

Super Junior-T

Super Junior-H

Super Junior-M

Super Junior-D&E

Super Show

Drama OST

Other

Logo songs

 Kangin's Reckless Radio - Eunhyuk, Sungmin, Donghae, Shindong, Leeteuk, Ryeowook ~ composed by Ryeowook
 Sukira (1) - Eunhyuk, Ryeowook, Leeteuk, Sungmin ~ composed by Ryeowook
 Sukira (2) - Eunhyuk, Yesung, Kyuhyun, Ryeowook ~ composed by Leeteuk + written by Eunhyuk
 Yesung's Miracle for you - Eunhyuk, Donghae, Leeteuk, Kangin, Sungmin ~ composed by Ryeowook
 Kangin & Jo Jung Rin's Chin Chin - Donghae, Ryeowook, Yesung ~ composed by Ryeowook
 Sungmin & Soo Young's Chunji - Ryeowook ~ composed by Ryeowook + written by Ryeowook
 Sungmin & Soo Young's Chunji ~ composed by Sungmin
 Kangin & Taeyeon's Chin Chin (1) - Kangin, Taeyeon ~ composed by Ryeowook
 Kangin & Taeyeon's Chin Chin (2) ~ Composed by Ryeowook
 Kangin & Taeyeon's Chin Chin (3) - Kyuhyun, Ryeowook, Yesung ~ composed by Leeteuk
 Strong Heart ~ co-composed by Donghae
 ShimShimTamPa ~ composed by Donghae

See also
 List of songs written by Kim Hee-chul
 List of songs written by Lee Donghae

References

Written
Super Junior